Baotou Iron and Steel Group, Baotou Steel or Baogang Group is an iron and steel state-owned enterprise in Baotou, Inner Mongolia, China. It was reorganized in 1998 from Baotou Iron and Steel Company established in 1954. It is the largest steel enterprise in Inner Mongolia. It has a large production base of iron and steel and the largest scientific research and production base of rare earths in China.

Its subsidiary company, Inner Mongolia Baotou Steel Union, was established and listed on the Shanghai Stock Exchange in 1997.

See also
 Baogang Tailings Dam

External links
Baotou Iron and Steel Group 
History of Baotou Steel since 1954.

References

Companies in the CSI 100 Index
Companies listed on the Shanghai Stock Exchange
Manufacturing companies established in 1954
Steel companies of China
Companies based in Baotou
Companies owned by the provincial government of China
Rare earth companies
1954 establishments in China